Blake Broadhurst (born 29 December 1985) is an Australian rules footballer who formerly played for Subiaco Football Club in the West Australian Football League (WAFL). In 2010, 2011 and 2012 he was the club's leading goalkicker. In 2011 he won the Bernie Naylor Medal for the most goals at the end of the home and away season in the WAFL with a tally of 68.

In 2013, Broadhurst signed with the Balwyn Football Club in the Eastern Football League, based in the eastern suburbs of Melbourne.

References

External links 
Blake Broadhurst's profile at WAFL Online
Broadhurst's Balwyn statistics at sportingpulse.com

1985 births
Living people
Australian rules footballers from Western Australia
Subiaco Football Club players